Anna Louise Tipton née Sharkey (born 1987) is a former British goalball player who competed at international level events. She is the younger sister of goalball player Michael Sharkey, they both played for Great Britain at the 2012 Summer Paralympics.

References

1987 births
Living people
Sportspeople from High Wycombe
Sportspeople from Southend-on-Sea
Paralympic goalball players of Great Britain
Goalball players at the 2012 Summer Paralympics